Khaleh Sara Rural District is a rural district (dehestan) in Asalem District, Talesh County, Gilan Province, Iran. At the 2006 census, its population was 6,930, in 1,691 families. The rural district has 13 villages.

References 

Rural Districts of Gilan Province
Talesh County